Gravesend United Football Club was a football club based in Gravesend, Kent. The club evolved from the Gravesend Football Club and was initially founded in 1893. It disbanded on two occasions in 1902 and 1914 and subsequent reformed in 1903 and 1931. It finally dissolved in 1946 when it amalgamated with Northfleet United to form Gravesend & Northfleet F.C.

History
The Gravesend Football Club in 1886 had sections playing both Rugby football and Association football. In the 1888–89 season the association football team reached the Kent Senior Cup semi–final, losing to eventual winners Chatham. In 1891 the rugby section was dropped and the club concentrated on association football playing at the Bat and Ball cricket ground. In 1891–92 the club were runners–up in the Kent Senior Cup (being overpowered in losing the final 11–0 to the Dover based Highland Light Infantry team).

In 1893 the cricket club refused the football club continued use of the Bat and Ball ground and consequently Gravesend United FC was formed amalgamating the Gravesend Football club with Gravesend Ormonde. The new club leased land at Overcliffe for their home ground and their team colours were red and green striped shirt with white shorts. In 1894 a company was formed (taking most of the profit from, but not managing, the football operation) to develop the ground with provision of a wooden stand and dressing rooms.

The club, nicknamed 'the Shrimpers', were founder members of the Kent League in 1894–95. In 1895 the Kent League recognised professional players and 'United' formally then became a club employing professional players. After two seasons in the Kent League the club switched in 1896–97 to the higher standard Southern League where they remained for five seasons. Initially 'the Shrimpers' finished in mid table but over the seasons their position deteriorated and in the 1900–01 campaign they concluded their period in the Southern League 13th of 15 teams.

For the five seasons whilst the club were members of the Southern League they entered the FA Cup competition. 'United' achieved a club best in 1898–99 by reaching the Fifth Qualifying round, being one of the remaining 42 clubs in that seasons competition before losing in a replay 2–0 to New Brompton. During this period the Gravesend United team twice won the Kent Senior Cup: in 1898 beating Dartford 3–1; and in 1900 beating Maidstone United 4–1 in a replayed final following a 1–1 draw.

The club were founder members in 1896–97 with five neighbouring clubs of the midweek Thames and Medway Combination and were runners–up in the inaugural season. A year later in 1897–98 'the Shrimpers' were Thames and Medway Combination champions after a play–off match 3–1 win over Chatham with whom they had been tied on equal points at the head of the table. The team were runners–up again in 1898–99 and once more the Thames and Medway's top club in the 1900–01 season (in a four team league).

In November 1898 Gravesend United absorbed the financially troubled neighbouring club Northfleet F.C. Despite this being styled as an amalgamation the club continued to be known as Gravesend United and continued playing in Gravesend's green and red colours and on their Overcliffe ground.

'The Shrimpers' final season in the Southern League in 1900–01 was in doubt both before and during the season. Prior to the season the Southern League organisation threatened to exclude them over refusal to pay a fine. This related to the previous season when the club prioritised a Kent Cup match and scratched a league fixture due to be played on the same date. The Football Association ruled that the Southern League had acted improperly in imposing the fine and the league reluctantly agreed to reinstate 'United'. As the season progressed the club, which had been on a financial tightrope for some time, faced an acute financial crisis: they had insufficient cash in mid–season to meet the rental for the clubs ground – donations to cover the cost resolved the immediate issue.

For the 1901–02 season 'United' were originally set to join the Southern League Division 2 but owing to their financial predicament the team opted to return to the less costly Kent League. Needing to keep outgoings low 'the Shrimpers' fielded a team comprising amateur players in a league in which clubs fielded professional players: the team consequently won only one of 19 matches played and were the league's bottom club. The ongoing financial difficulties led to the club disbanding at the end of the season and the Company behind the clubs Overcliffe ground improvements liquidated itself and sold–off the stand and fittings.

After a one year hiatus a Gravesend club resurfaced in 1903–04 playing in the West Kent League (having taken over the defunct Deptford's fixtures) with a reserve team in the Dartford and District League. The club played on an enclosed ground at White Post off Pelham Road in the town. The club resurrected the Gravesend United name for the 1904–05 season and continued as West Kent League members. 

Thereafter from the 1905–06 season the club joined the Kent League and in both that initial campaign and then in 1908–09 'the Shrimpers' were runners–up in the league losing out on each occasion by two points, to New Brompton and Northfleet United respectively. Upon joining the Kent League, which initially had 8 member teams, to fill out their season 'United' also rejoined the Thames and Medway Combination for initially two seasons before in 1907–08 switching to the West Kent League Division 1 as a secondary competition. In this latter league the team were runners–up for the 1907–08 season by a two point margin to Northfleet United. 'The Shrimpers' remained in the West Kent for one more season after which following reorganisation and expansion of the Kent League (which added a Western Division which incorporated members of the West Kent League) for the 1909–10 campaign the team returned for two final seasons as members of the Thames and Medway Combination – in the latter season the league comprised two three team sections. By 1911 the Kent League had expanded to 15 members requiring its member clubs to play 28 fixtures.

In 1910–11 'United' were losing Kent Senior Cup semi–finalists and two seasons later in 1912–13 the team were Kent Senior Cup runners–up losing the final 2–1 to local rivals Northfleet United. The club commenced the 1914–15 season playing in the Kent League but owing to the outbreak of the Great War the league was cancelled and the Gravesend United club disbanded.

The club didn't immediately reappear after the war owing chiefly to their inability to secure a ground on which to play. In 1928 the funds, amounting to over £89, of the now defunct Gravesend United club which had been disbanded at the start of the war were distributed to charity.

The Gravesend United name returned to football in 1932 in the Western Section Division 1 of the Kent Amateur League when the formerly named Gravesend Territorials, who played at Central Avenue in Gravesend, decided to run as a 'civil' club and took on the 'United' name. The Territorials had been league runners–up in the 1930–31 campaign and in the 'United' clubs first season of 1932–33 the team equalled this achievement. For the following two seasons (from 1933 through to 1935) 'the Shrimpers' were members of the Kent League Division 2 with a reserve team continuing in the Kent Amateur League. Gravesend United were semi–finalists in the 1933–34 Kent Amateur Cup losing, following a replay, to the eventual winners the Chatham Royal Naval Depot.

After the 1934–35 season Division 2 of the Kent League was disbanded and 'United' returned to the now expanded Kent Amateur League and were the 1935–36 season champions of the newly formed Western Section Premier Division. The club continued in this league for a further three seasons whereupon matches were suspended owing to the outbreak of World War II.

'The Shrimpers' joined the wartime Kent Senior League for three seasons from 1942 and additionally played in the wartime South Eastern Combination for two seasons (1943–44 & 1944–45). The team were losing semi–finalists in the Kent Senior Cup in both 1942 and 1943 and progressed one stage further in 1944 to the Kent Senior Cup final where they were beaten 5–3 by the Royal Arsenal (Woolwich). The Kent League resumed in 1944–45 with 'the Shrimpers' as members and the team were losing semi–finalists in the League Cup competition. The club played it's final season as Gravesend United in 1945–46 as members of the Kent League and towards the end of that campaign were beaten at the semi–final stage of both the Kent League Cup and the Kent Senior Cup competitions.

In 1946 the club merged with Northfleet United to form Gravesend & Northfleet F.C. The new club played at Stonebridge Road, the ground of the Northfleet United club in the latter teams red and white colours.

In 2007 the Gravesend & Northfleet club renamed itself as Ebbsfleet United.

Honours
Kent League
Runners–up: 1905–06; 1908–09.
Thames and Medway Combination
Champions: 1897–98; 1900–01.
Runners–up: 1896–97; 1898–99.
West Kent League
Division 1: Runners–up: 1907–08.
Kent Amateur League
Western Section; Premier Division: Champions: 1935–36.
Western Section; Division 1: Runners–up: 1932–33.
Kent Senior Cup 
Winners: 1897–98; 1899–1900.
Runners–up: 1891–92 (As Gravesend FC); 1912–1913; 1943–1944.

Season playing records

Key

League Record
Pld = Played
W = Games won
D = Games drawn
L = Games lost
GF = Goals for
GA = Goals against
Pts = Points
Pos = Final position/rank

FA Cup
EP = Extra Preliminary round
P = Preliminary round
1Q = First qualifying round
2Q = Second qualifying round
3Q = Third qualifying round
4Q = Fourth qualifying round
5Q = Fifth qualifying round

'Other'
KSC = Kent Senior Cup
KAC = Kent Amateur Cup
KLC = Kent League Cup
† = Club named Gravesend FC

References

External links
 Football Club History Database: Gravesend United
 Non–League Football Matters: The 'original' Kent League 1894–1959
 Non–League Football Matters: Southern League 1894–1939
 Non–League Football Matters: Kent Amateur League
 The Emirates FA Cup: Past Results

1893 establishments in England
Association football clubs established in 1893
1946 disestablishments in England
Association football clubs disestablished in 1946
Defunct football clubs in England
Kent Football League (1894–1959)
Southern Football League clubs
Gravesend, Kent
Gravesham
Ebbsfleet United F.C.